Michelle Parun (born 2 November 1966) is a New Zealand former professional tennis player.

Active on tour in the 1980s, Parun was a junior doubles finalist at the 1984 Australian Open (with Jackie Masters) and reached a best singles ranking of 222 in the world. She made WTA Tour main draw appearances at the Auckland Open and featured in the qualifying draw of the 1986 Wimbledon Championships.

Parun is a niece of tennis player Onny Parun.

References

External links
 
 

1966 births
Living people
New Zealand female tennis players
20th-century New Zealand women